KF Renova is a football club based in the village of Džepčište, Tetovo Municipality, North Macedonia. They recently competed in the Macedonian First League.

History
FK Renova was founded in 2003 but was derived from the football school established in 2000. As a result of successful work in 2003, the people from Džepčište began to invest in this school of football. Since then, the football school was named Renova, after the Džepčište based manufacturing company, which invested the most to the club. Renova then merged with the Tetovo club FK Shkumbini and was initiated into the Macedonian Third League.

In the club's first season, they came first in the league. To achieve promotion into the second league, Renova had to beat Vardar from Negotino. Renova won the game via penalty shootout. In the 2004–2005 season, Renova achieved second position, allowing the club to move up to the Macedonian First League.

In the 2009-10 season, Renova won the Macedonian First League title, being the youngest Macedonian football club to do so. Two years later they won their first Macedonian Cup title by defeating Rabotnički 3–1 in the final.

In July 2022, Renova withdrew from the First Macedonian Football League due to financial reasons. From the 2022–23 season, they will restart from the Macedonian Regional Football Leagues.

Rivalry
FK Renova was created by Albanians from Džepčište. However, the club is multi ethnic and appeals to both Albanians and Macedonians. The club's main rivalry are KF Shkëndija, a club supported by Albanians, and FK Teteks, whose fans are Macedonian.

Honours
Macedonian First League
Winners (1): 2009–10
Macedonian Football Cup
Winners (1): 2012

Recent seasons

1The 2019–20 season was abandoned due to the COVID-19 pandemic in North Macedonia.

Renova in Europe
 Q = qualifier
 R1 = first round / R2 = second round

Players

Current squad

Notable players
Had international caps for their respective countries. Players whose name is listed in bold represented their countries while playing for FK Renova.

 Patrick Mevoungou
 Xhelil Abdulla
 Muharem Bajrami
 Argjend Beqiri
 Vulnet Emini
 Besart Ibraimi
 Agron Memedi
 Visar Musliu
 Igor Savevski
 Goran Siljanovski
 Metodija Stepanovski
 Vlatko Stojanovski
 Abdoulaye Sileye Gaye

Historical list of coaches

 Gani Sejdiu (Jun 2005 – Dec 2005)
 Toni Jakimovski (7 Dec 2005 – Jun 2006)
 Zoran Smileski (Jul 2006 – Nov 2006)
 Vlatko Kostov (1 Dec 2006 – Nov 2007)
 Bylbyl Sokoli (15 Nov 2007 – Jun 2008)
 Vlatko Kostov (Jul 2008 – 14 Jun 2010)
 Nexhat Shabani (1 Jul 2010 – 5 Nov 2010)
 Bylbyl Sokoli (10 Nov 2010 – 29 Jul 2011)
 Bujar Islami (30 Jul 2011 – 22 Aug 2011)
 Vlatko Kostov (23 Aug 2011 – 12 Aug 2012)
 Qatip Osmani (22 Aug 2012 – 1 Jun 2017)
 Vlatko Kostov (14 Jun 2017 – 9 Apr 2018)
 Agron Memedi & Kushtrim Abdulahu (10 Apr 2018 – 20 Jun 2018)
 Jeton Beqiri (21 Jun 2018 – 25 Sep 2018)
 Nikola Ilievski (9 Oct 2018 – 30 Jun 2019)
 Bujar Islami (1 Jul 2019 –)

References

External links
Official Website 
Club info at MacedonianFootball 
Football Federation of Macedonia 

 
Football clubs in North Macedonia
FK
Association football clubs established in 2003
2003 establishments in the Republic of Macedonia
Renova